Moechotypa ceylonica is a species of beetle in the family Cerambycidae. It was described by Stephan von Breuning in 1938. It is known from Sri Lanka.

References

ceylonica
Beetles described in 1938